The third legislature of the Rwandan Senate commenced in 2019 and will end in 2027.

The Senate is the upper house of the Parliament of Rwanda and has 26 members:

 12 senators elected by the councils
 8 senators appointed by the President
 4 senators designated by the Forum of Political organizations
 1 senator elected by public universities
 1 senator elected by private universities

Members of the Senate 

The current members of the Senate are as follows:

See also
 First legislature of the Rwandan Senate
 Second legislature of the Rwandan Senate

References

External links 
 Senators Profiles

Parliament of Rwanda
Government of Rwanda
Rwanda
2019 establishments in Rwanda